Crystal Dynamics, Inc. is an American video game developer based in San Mateo, California, and part of Embracer Group. The studio's games include entries in the Gex, Legacy of Kain, and Tomb Raider series.

Madeline Canepa, Judy Lange, and Dave Morse founded Crystal Dynamics in July 1992 as a spin-off of The 3DO Company and soon hired Strauss Zelnick as its president and chief executive officer (CEO). The studio initially developed games for The 3DO Company's 3DO Interactive Multiplayer system, with its first, Crash 'n Burn, shipping as part of the system in October 1993. Lange left the company in 1994, following a failed attempt to establish Crystal Dynamics as a third-party publisher via an intermediate company. Zelnick left in 1995 to be replaced by Randy Komisar. Between 1995 and 1996, Crystal Dynamics created Gex and published Blood Omen: Legacy of Kain. As the company faced financial struggles, it raised capital through Technology Partners and its general partner Ted Ardell, who instituted layoffs of a third of the studio's staff, including Canepa and Komisar, installed himself as CEO, and later hired Rob Dyer as president.

After financial issues persisted through 1997, Crystal Dynamics agreed to a takeover by the British publisher Eidos Interactive, which was finalized in November 1998 and saw the exit of Dyer. Under its new owner, the studio created several different kinds of projects, including Project: Snowblind, which had been planned to be part of the Deus Ex series. Eidos put Crystal Dynamics in charge of the Tomb Raider series in 2003, after Tomb Raider: The Angel of Darkness by the series' creator, Core Design, had been a commercial failure. Crystal Dynamics developed a modernized trilogy of Tomb Raider games: Tomb Raider: Legend (2006), Tomb Raider: Anniversary (2007), and Tomb Raider: Underworld (2008).

Following Underworld, the studio began work on a reboot trilogy of the series. During this time, the studio canceled the game Downfall, and Eidos was acquired by Square Enix and renamed Square Enix Limited. The first two games in the new trilogy, Tomb Raider and Rise of the Tomb Raider, were released in 2013 and 2015, respectively. Thereafter, Crystal Dynamics developed Marvel's Avengers while handing the third Tomb Raider game, Shadow of the Tomb Raider, to the sister studio Eidos-Montréal. In August 2018, Crystal Dynamics established the satellite studio Crystal Northwest in Bellevue, Washington, followed by Crystal Southwest in Austin, Texas, in May 2021. In August 2022, Square Enix sold Crystal Dynamics and several related assets to Embracer Group, where they became part of CDE Entertainment. As of April 2022, Crystal Dynamics is developing another Tomb Raider game and is assisting The Initiative with the development of Perfect Dark.

History

Background and early years (1989–1994) 
Crystal Dynamics was founded by Madeline Canepa, Judy Lange, and Dave Morse. Morse, a founder of Amiga Corporation, had previously founded New Technology Group with Dave Needle and Robert J. Mical in 1989 to create a video game console that could succeed those by Nintendo and Sega. In 1990, New Technology Group's founders discussed this idea with Trip Hawkins, the chief executive officer (CEO) of Electronic Arts, who shared with them his vision for such a system. The two companies signed an agreement in September 1990 that would see New Technology Group develop the system under Electronic Arts' provision of software and money. The development of what would become the 3DO Interactive Multiplayer began in 1991, and out of the partnership between New Technology Group and Electronic Arts grew The 3DO Company, led by Hawkins. Canepa and Lange had been marketing executives for Sega, where Canepa (the "Mother of Sonic") had been integral in the launch of Sonic the Hedgehog. On July 8, 1992, Canepa, Lange, and Morse spun off Crystal Dynamics from The 3DO Company as an independent developer. Its first offices were located in the retail space of Palo Alto Airport in Palo Alto, California. Crystal Dynamics started out simultaneously developing Crash 'n Burn and Total Eclipse, which were announced for the then-upcoming 3DO in April 1993. Developing for the 3DO meant that it could produce games for CD-ROM, avoiding the higher costs of cartridges. A 1993 editorial in Electronic Gaming Monthly declared the studio "the hottest new video game company on the upscale scene". In June 1993, Strauss Zelnick resigned as president and CEO of 20th Century Fox to become the president and CEO of the nascent studio. He acquired between 25% and 50% of the company. Lange, who had acted as Crystal Dynamics' president, stated that he had been hired for his business expertise, whereas the creative expertise was already present at the studio, which had twenty-eight developers at that time. Zelnick's background in film and television increased Crystal Dynamics' focus on full-motion video in its games.

Crash 'n Burn was released as part of the 3DO in October 1993. In January 1994, Zelnick was in the process of setting up the company Star Interactive, which was to publish third-party games by outsourcing the management and distribution to Crystal Dynamics, as well as the manufacturing to a third company. The management was to consist of The Software Toolworks' former senior vice president (VP) Mark Beaumont as CEO, as well as Crystal Dynamics' now-executive VP Lange and VP of sales Allen Chaplin. In February, Zelnick announced his intent for Crystal Dynamics to, like a movie studio, produce its own games while also releasing titles from other, independent developers. As such, it partnered with Toys for Bob for several games, starting with The Horde. In March, Bertelsmann Music Group (BMG), which Zelnick had been consulting, agreed to handle marketing and distribution for Crystal Dynamics and Star Interactive outside of North America. As Star Interactive failed to raise , the plan for this company was scrapped in early 1994 and Lange departed Crystal Dynamics shortly thereafter. In August, Crystal Dynamics had more than 100 employees. Despite Zelnick steering Crystal Dynamics away from relying solely on the 3DO and the company becoming the first licensed third-party developer for the PlayStation, the 3DO's poor commercial performance had a significant impact on the company. John Eastburn, the studio's chief operating officer, estimated that 3DO game developers could not break even unless its consumer base expanded from 75,000 to 500,000. In September, Zelnick was announced as the new manager for BMG's North American operations. He would join the company in January 1995 while remaining a director and shareholder in Crystal Dynamics. The vacant CEO position attracted several parties interested in acquiring the studio. The studio partnered with Matsushita Electric, the manufacturer of the 3DO, in December 1994 to have its 3DO games distributed through 10,000 consumer electronics stores.

Gex, Legacy of Kain, and acquisition by Eidos (1995–1999) 
Looking to come up with a mascot character for itself, the studio sought after an animal that was generally liked and had interesting abilities. The result was Gex, an anthropomorphic gecko introduced with the game of the same name in 1995. Geckos' ability to walk on walls allowed the development team to implement planar and vertical platforming elements despite the 3DO's limitations. In 1995, Crystal Dynamics hired LucasArts' Randy Komisar as CEO and began converting its older 3DO games to the PlayStation and Sega Saturn. Around this time, Crystal Dynamics' publishing arm released Slam 'N Jam '95 and Blazing Dragons, and it was working with Canada-based Silicon Knights on Blood Omen: Legacy of Kain. The game was already expansive in content but lacked structure, wherefore Crystal Dynamics brought Amy Hennig into the project to help make the game more engaging. By 1996, due chiefly to the unexpectedly slow growth of the next-generation games market, the studio's expansion in its early years had failed to pay off. The company had raised capital through Technology Partners, and that company's general partner Ted Ardell announced a reorganization of the studio in June 1996: Of its 102 employees, a third would be laid off over a course of three months, while Komisar, Canepa, and Eastburn would be ousted and Ardell installed as the new CEO. Crystal Dynamics also ceased publishing efforts to focus solely on internally developed games. Ardell managed the day-to-day operations while Crystal Dynamics lacked a president until Rob Dyer was promoted to this position in April 1997. Surplus computer hardware and office equipment were auctioned off from its newer Menlo Park office in September of that year.

Following the release of Enter the Gecko, Crystal Dynamics began producing Gex 3: Deep Cover Gecko. By this point, many developers–including close to the entire team of the original Gex–had left the company, and some of them had joined Naughty Dog. Bruce Straley, a designer on Enter the Gecko, was initially offered to direct the third game but chose to join his friends at Naughty Dog instead. Crystal Dynamics further began the development of a second Legacy of Kain game, codenamed Shifter, without Silicon Knights' involvement. While original characters were created by Hennig and Seth Carus, Silicon Knights filed an injunction, accusing Crystal Dynamics of plagiarizing the characters from Blood Omen. In a private settlement, the two companies agreed that Crystal Dynamics could use Blood Omens characters as long as Silicon Knights was credited as their creator. Thus, Shifter became Legacy of Kain: Soul Reaver. The studio had returned to over 100 employees by this time. Originally set to close on October 31, the acquisition was completed on November 5, 1998. Dyer and Crystal Dynamics' VP of marketing Scott Steinberg subsequently acceded to Eidos Interactive as president and senior VP of marketing, respectively, in January 1999.

Projects under Eidos and Tomb Raider (1999–2009) 
Crystal Dynamics' early releases under Eidos included Mad Dash Racing and Whiplash. The publisher also sought the company to create a first-person shooter with a sci-fi setting, similar to the Deus Ex series of games. During this game's development, Eidos mandated the game to be part of the series, giving it the name Deus Ex: Clan Wars. However, six months before the game's completion, the game was detached from the series again and ultimately renamed Project: Snowblind. Around this time, the sister studio Core Design was completing its work Tomb Raider: The Angel of Darkness, its sixth game in the Tomb Raider series within seven years. Many developers at Crystal Dynamics were disappointed with the game's poor final state, which artist Daniel Cabuco believed came from fatigue for Tomb Raider games at Core Design. After its 2003 release, The Angel of Darkness became a commercial failure, and Eidos assigned the series to Crystal Dynamics. Several employees were excited for the possibility of working on a large franchise they had played themselves before. Hennig requested to be involved with such a project, but she was directed to design another Soul Reaver game instead, leading her to leave the studio and join Naughty Dog and create the Uncharted series.

For its first Tomb Raider game, Tomb Raider: Legend, the developers played through all previous games and read guides to gain a better understanding of their design. They additionally intended to return to the series' roots of exploring abandoned places while adding an original feel, particularly through a new control scheme. The game was released in April 2006 and proved successful, selling 2.9 million copies within its first few months. With the end of Legends production, its designers pitched Tomb Raider: Anniversary, a remake of the original Tomb Raider for its tenth anniversary. They worked with Toby Gard, one of the original developers, on insight for intents behind certain scenes, as well as concepts that could not have been realized originally. As the development continued, the game's scope was decreased to roughly half of the original game, which had been deemed too large to entirely remake. Certain aspects of the new gameplay, which was principally based on that of Legend, also did not translate well to parts of the original game's design, leading to several adjustments that deviated from the original. The game was completed within nine months. The last game in Crystal Dynamics' original Tomb Raider trilogy, with its focus on modernizing its legacy, was Tomb Raider: Underworld. Around the time of Underworlds development, one team within the studio sought to establish a new intellectual property. They pitched Downfall, a post-apocalyptic open world game set in San Francisco. However, working on two large projects at the same time was considered too ambitious, leading to Downfalls cancelation in favor of the next Tomb Raider game. Crystal Dynamics subsequently laid off roughly 30 people in January 2009, with Eidos stating that the studio would increasingly focus on Tomb Raider going forward. Another 25 staffers were dismissed in June. In the same year, Darrell Gallagher became the Crystal Dynamics' head of studio, and Eidos Interactive was acquired by Square Enix and integrated into its Western operations, becoming Square Enix Limited.

Tomb Raider reboot series and acquisition by Embracer Group (2009–present) 
For the next Tomb Raider game, Crystal Dynamics intended to reboot the series with new concepts to reach new audiences. For several years, the development team experimented with several gameplay concepts but felt that many of them deviated too strongly from the series' core concepts and shifted to focusing only on elements that felt like a good fit for the series. The final design was characterized as a modernized take on the series, with a focus on survival and storytelling. The creative directors devised it as the beginning of a new origin story that was then planned out over three games. To sustain the Tomb Raider franchise in the meantime, Crystal Dynamics also developed Lara Croft and the Guardian of Light, which featured the same protagonist in a different gameplay style. The first game in the reboot trilogy, simply titled Tomb Raider, was released in 2013. The studio followed up Lara Croft and the Guardian of Light with Lara Croft and the Temple of Osiris in 2014, and Tomb Raider with Rise of the Tomb Raider in 2015. In December of that year, Square Enix announced that Gallagher had left the studio and had been replaced with Scot Amos and Ron Rosenberg. Brian Horton, the director of Rise of the Tomb Raider and senior art director for Tomb Raider, left in 2016.

In January 2017, Square Enix announced a partnership with Marvel Entertainment to create multiple video games based on Marvel properties, with Crystal Dynamics developing Marvel's Avengers. The studio had pitched a single-player game akin to Tomb Raider that would see the player take control of the Avengers group of superheroes, switching between characters as the story progressed. However, the development team soon felt unhappy that, despite employing several player characters, only one of them was playable at a time and the impression that the Avengers were a team was not well represented. Instead, the game was refocused into a multiplayer game. With Crystal Dynamics working on Marvel's Avengers, the third game in the Tomb Raider reboot trilogy, Shadow of the Tomb Raider, was handed to the sister studio Eidos-Montréal, with a small team at Crystal Dynamics working on smaller parts of the game. In August 2018, Crystal Dynamics opened a satellite studio in Bellevue, Washington called Crystal Northwest to support the development of Marvel's Avengers. The late stages of the development of Marvel's Avengers saw the onset of the COVID-19 pandemic and consequent shift to work from home, which the studio had not been used to. Because developers now worked mostly alone, the game launched with several issues that they had not been aware of beforehand and needed to be addressed later on. Afterward, Crystal Dynamics implemented hybrid work and remote hiring.

In May 2021, Crystal Dynamics opened another studio, Crystal Southwest, in Austin, Texas, under the leadership of Dallas Dickinson, who had been an executive producer for the company. Crystal Dynamics partnered with The Initiative, a studio founded by Gallagher, in September 2021 to work on Perfect Dark, a reboot of the series of the same name. The studio further announced a new Tomb Raider game in April 2022. The holding company expressed interest in sequels, remakes and remasters in established franchises of the studio, such as Tomb Raider and Legacy of Kain. The acquisition was completed on August 26, 2022, with the assets being held under CDE Entertainment.

Games developed

References

External links 

 

1992 establishments in California
1998 mergers and acquisitions
2022 mergers and acquisitions
American companies established in 1992
American subsidiaries of foreign companies
Eidos
Embracer Group
Square Enix
Video game companies established in 1992
Video game companies of the United States
Video game development companies